

Horne is a rural village and civil parish in the District of Tandridge in Surrey, England.  The parish includes the hamlet of Newchapel, where the British Wildlife Centre is situated. Eastern fields forming a narrow part of the parish are split by the A22 road, a main road to East Grinstead.

At the 2011 Census the civil parish included the population of Newchapel.

History
A British (Celtic) gold coin has been found in Horne, but is more probably a mark of transit than of settlement. Otherwise there are no prehistoric remains, such as are usually found in other Wealden parishes. Horne must have owed such importance as it had later to the iron industry.

The parish lay within the Anglo-Saxon Tandridge hundred, where the wealthy and powerful would meet periodically at a level below that of the shire to decide on strategic matters, and later for settling disputes in the Hundred Court. The earliest reference to Horne by name was in the 12th century.  Horne had a chapelry and manor but did not become a parish until 1705, from the southernmost part of Bletchingley (parish).

Mr. Stileman, who was instituted parson in 1728, bought a house near the church, but this was afterwards bought by the parish for a workhouse, and so continued to be used until the Poor Law Amendment Act 1834.  Horne Common was inclosed by an Act of 1810 and an order made on 14 April 1813.  Jesus College, Cambridge parted with Horne Court Manor in 1891 to allow a parsonage house to be built instead.

In 1953 parish boundaries were changed with the southern part of Horne gaining its own civil parish council, Felbridge, whilst to compensate for this parts of Godstone and Tandridge were added.  Although the electoral division at County Hall is named Lingfield, which is well-known throughout the region for its horse-racing course, that neighbouring parish has no other historic connection to the village, nor the others within its division.

Landmarks

Airfield and barrage balloon site
A temporary airfield was established to support the Normandy landings in early 1944 on farmland straddling Bones Lane. It was constructed in three months and used for just seven weeks from May to June 1944. Thereafter it served as an anti-V-1 rocket balloon site for a month and was returned to farmland in 1945.

The following units were here at some point:
 No. 130 (Punjab) Squadron RAF
 No. 142 Airfield RAF became No. 142 (Fighter) Wing RAF
 No. 303 (Kosciusko) Squadron RAF
 No. 402 Squadron RCAF

Church
The heavily restored church in the heart of the village, dedicated to St Mary the Virgin, has 14th- and 15th-century windows.  The south door dates from 1250, and there is a 14th-century oak screen and 15th-century chancel beams. Considerable restoration was undertaken in 1880., which robbed the building of almost all its archaeological interest and completely destroyed its early history.

The oldest feature now remaining is the south doorway, which dates from the middle of the 13th century, but this may possibly have been inserted in the walls of a 12th-century nave. A slight inclination of the chancel to the north shows rebuilding of the east end of the church, but here again the absence of any original detail earlier than a 15th-century rood stair in the west end of the south wall makes the dating of this rebuilding, if indeed it ever took place, a matter of conjecture.

British Wildlife Centre
The British Wildlife Centre lies in the east of the parish, and has a collection of over 40 species of wildlife.  The centre, developed on the site of a former dairy farm, opened in 1997, and participates in captive breeding programmes.

Geography
The parish except for its far north, yielding sedimentary ironstone, is on the Wealden Clay and was until the 16th century forested, rather than interspersed with six woodlands as it is today.  Hornecourt Wood by the northern border is a Site of Special Scientific Interest.   At the opposite end of the parish, Home Wood also occupies approximately 5% of the land. Elevations vary from 115m to 48m above sea level and the parish has several sources of the River Eden, Kent.

Demography and housing
The proportion of households in Horne who owned their home outright was within 4% of the borough and regional average.  The proportion who owned their home with a loan was 8% greater than the regional average; providing overall a lower proportion than average of rented residential property and of social housing, and close to the average in Surrey.

The average level of accommodation in the region composed of detached houses was 28%, the average that was apartments was 22.6%.

Local government
The United Kingdom Census 2011 considered the parish which is within the ward Burstow, Horne and Outwood, containing three of the four villages of the south-west of Tandridge.  The parish borders the extreme south of the two central parishes, Godstone and Limpsfield.   At Surrey County Council, one of 81 councillors represents the area who sits at Kingston for a division simplistically named Lingfield.

Transport
The civil parish has no motorways or railways. Guildford, the county town is further than this.

Horne is served by bus services 315 to Redhill and East Surrey Hospital and 236 to Crawley via Gatwick Airport.

Eastern fields are split by the A22 road, a main road to East Grinstead, which also is used by those closest to the route as opposed to the M23 and main coastal route to access Eastbourne, a large coastal town and the route is a main one for a small portion of East Sussex.

Notes and references
Notes 
  
References

External links

A Vision of Britain Through Time
British History Online
British Listed Buildings
Genuki
Office for National Statistics

Tandridge
Civil parishes in Surrey
Villages in Surrey